Glory of Heroes by Wanmingyang Media was announced on February 18, 2016 The first Glory of Heroes event took place on April 2 in Shenzhen, China.

List of events

Rise of Heroes 5

Rise of Heroes 5 was a kickboxing event held on December 17, 2016 at the Jiangnan Gymnasium in Nanning, China.

Results

Conquest of Heroes

Conquest of Heroes was a MMA event held on December 2 and 3, 2016 at the Jiyuan Basketball Stadium Jiyuan, Henan, China. January 15, 2017 every Sunday 21:50 Shenzhen Television broadcast.

Results

Rise of Heroes 4: Europe VS China

Rise of Heroes 4 was a kickboxing event held on November 19, 2016 at the Salle Du Midi in Martigny, Switzerland.

Results

Rise of Heroes 3

Rise of Heroes 3 was a kickboxing event held on October 29, 2016 at the Changji Gymnasium in Changji, Xinjiang, China.

Results

Rise of Heroes 2

Rise of Heroes 2 was a kickboxing event held on October 15, 2016 at the Nanchang Institute of Technology Stadium in Zhangshu, Jiangxi, China.

Results

Glory of Heroes 5

Glory of Heroes 5 was a kickboxing event held on October 1, 2016 at the Henan Province Sports Center Stadium in Zhengzhou, China.

Results

Rise of Heroes 1

Rise of Heroes 1 was a kickboxing event held on September 17, 2016 at the Chaoyang Stadium in Chaoyang, Liaoning, China.

Results

Glory of Heroes 4

Glory of Heroes 4 was a kickboxing event held on August 6, 2016 at the Changzhi Stadium in Changzhi, Shanxi, China.

Results

Glory of Heroes 3

Glory of Heroes 3 was a kickboxing event held on July 2, 2016 at the Jiyuan Basketball Stadium in Jiyuan, Henan, China.

Results

Glory of Heroes 2

Glory of Heroes 2 was a kickboxing event held on May 7, 2016 at the Bao'an Stadium in Shenzhen, China.

Results

Glory of Heroes 1

Glory of Heroes 1 was a kickboxing event held on April 2, 2016 at the Bao'an Stadium in Shenzhen, China.

Results

See also
2016 in Glory
2016 in K-1
2016 in Kunlun Fight

References

2016 in kickboxing
Kickboxing in China